Wolfgang Bochow (26 May 1944 – 14 September 2017) was a badminton player from West Germany who rated among the world's best in the late 1960s and early 1970s. Tall and powerful, he had one of the strongest backhands in the game.

Career 
Bochow won the gold medal at the 1972 European Badminton Championships in men's singles. Between 1968 and 1976 he won eight other medals at this biennial event; three bronzes and a silver in mixed doubles, a silver and two bronzes in singles, and a bronze in men's doubles. Bochow was a men's singles semi-finalist in the 1971 All-England Championships and an All-England mixed doubles finalist with  Irmgard Latz (Gerlatzka) in 1970.

He was the bronze medalist at the 1972 Munich Olympic Games in the singles discipline when badminton was played as a demonstration sport. Bochow won 15 German National titles between 1963 and 1975, 8 in men's singles, 2 in men's doubles and 5 in mixed doubles.

References

External links 

1944 births
German male badminton players
Badminton players at the 1972 Summer Olympics
Sportspeople from Braunschweig
Recipients of the Silver Laurel Leaf
2017 deaths